St. Thomas' Episcopal Parish Historic District is a national historic district located at Croom, Prince George's County, Maryland. The district encompasses four contributing buildings and three contributing sites associated with St. Thomas' Church.  The other contributing buildings are the Gothic Revival style St. Thomas' Church Rectory (1852-1853), Tenant/Sexton's House (c. 1890), and tobacco barn (c. 1905).  The contributing sites are the St. Thomas' Episcopal Church Cemetery, St. Simon's Mission Chapel Site, and St. Simon's Cemetery.  The African-American communicants of St. Thomas' Church formed St. Simon's Mission Chapel in the late-19th century and it operated on the property associated with the Croome Industrial and Agricultural School (Croom Settlement School), which operated from about 1902 to 1952.

It was listed on the National Register of Historic Places in 2011.

References

External links
, including undated photo and boundary map, at Maryland Historical Trust website

St. Thomas Parish, Diocese of Washington

Churches completed in 1745
Houses completed in 1853
Houses completed in 1890
Gothic Revival architecture in Maryland
Churches in Prince George's County, Maryland
Episcopal church buildings in Maryland
18th-century Episcopal church buildings
Historic American Buildings Survey in Maryland
Historic districts on the National Register of Historic Places in Maryland
National Register of Historic Places in Prince George's County, Maryland